Aditi Balan is an Indian actress, dancer and model who works in Tamil, Malayalam and Telugu films. She is best known for her role as Aruvi in the film Aruvi. After the completion of her law degree in Chennai, she appeared in an uncredited,brief role in Yennai Arindhaal (2015).

Career 
She first featured in the movie Yennai Arindhal (2015) in an uncredited, brief role. She then got the opportunity to play a lead role in the film, Aruvi. It was one of the biggest hits in 2017, and her performance was unanimously praised by critics. She received many accolades for Aruvi including Filmfare Critics Award for Best Actress – South.

Filmography

Films

Web series

Awards and nominations

Notes

References

External links 

21st-century Indian actresses
Indian film actresses
Actresses in Tamil cinema
Living people
Filmfare Awards South winners
Actresses in Malayalam cinema
Year of birth missing (living people)